This is Not a Love Song is a 2002 British film directed by Bille Eltringham and starring Michael Colgan, Kenneth Glenaan, David Bradley and John Henshaw. It is the first film to be streamed live on the Internet simultaneously with its cinema premiere.

The film was available online 5–19 September 2003.

External links
Official website (archived 2012)

2002 films
British thriller films
Films with screenplays by Simon Beaufoy
2000s English-language films
2000s British films